The term radical center can refer to:
 Radical centrism, a political movement
 a mathematical construct: also called the power center (geometry)